Robert Bateman High School (also known as Robert Bateman, or Bateman) operated in Burlington, Ontario, Canada from 1970 to 2020. The school was part of the Halton District School Board, and was established as Lord Elgin High School.  After a merger with General Brock High School in 2004 it was renamed Robert Bateman High School.

Basic information
Formerly known as Lord Elgin High School, this school merged with General Brock High School in 2004, and was named after Robert Bateman, a noted Canadian artist and naturalist.  Bateman had previously held a placement as a geography and art teacher at Lord Elgin in the 1970s.

Robert Bateman High School enrols about 800 students within the Applied, Academic, and IB level.

Bateman was a host of the IB Programme; Students from neighbouring cities enroll at Robert Bateman High School for the year programme, which entailed 2 years of free, pre-IB classes, and the 2 year IB programme itself. As well as the IB programme, the school's curriculum featured a variety of service-related courses, in both Mechanics and the Culinary Arts.

The school was closed on June 30, 2020.

Athletics

Clubs, teams, and extra-curricular programs
Robert Bateman High School offers a wide variety of clubs, teams, and extra-curricular activities open to all students:

Student Council
Anime Club
Youth in Action
Culture Fusion
Bateman Environmental Activist Team (BEAT)
Link Crew
Dance Company
French Club
Chess Club
Begbie (history) contest
Mock Trial
Math Club
Vocal Group
Concert Band
Jazz Band
RBHS Tech Crew (A/V Team)
Debate
Improv
Bateman’s Athletic Council (BAC)
Auto Club
Book Club
DECA
Sears Drama
Fellowship Group
Homework Club
Leadership & Mentorship
Model U.N.
Gay Straight Alliance (GSA)
School Newspaper
REACH
Year Book
Writing Club

Academic performance
Academically, Robert Bateman High School is rated overall 6.8 out of 10 on the Fraser Institute Report Card and ranked 233 out of 676 in all of Ontario Secondary Schools.

Compared to other surrounding Secondary Schools (Nelson High School, Assumption Catholic Secondary School, and Lester B. Pearson High School),  Robert Bateman ranked an average 10% below the other schools' 2011 Fraser Report Cards. However, the school ranked near par in both OSSLT scores and Average Level Grade 9 Academic Math, and lays within average scores (7.4-5.0) when compared to the whole of Ontario Secondary Schools.

Notable alumni

 Mark Appleyard, professional skateboarder

Notable faculty
Robert Bateman, Canadian naturalist and artist

See also
List of high schools in Ontario

References

External links
Robert Bateman High School

High schools in Burlington, Ontario
International Baccalaureate schools in Ontario
1970 establishments in Ontario
2020 disestablishments in Ontario
Educational institutions established in 1970
Educational institutions disestablished in 2020